Trendz (stylized in all caps) is a South Korean boy band formed by Interpark Music Plus. The group currently consists of seven members: Havit, Leon, Yoonwoo, Hankook, ra.L, Eunil, and Yechan. The group made their official debut on January 5, 2022, with their first EP titled Blue Set Chapter 1. Tracks.

History

Pre-debut
In late 2017, Havit, Leon, and Hankook competed on the survival reality show Mix Nine, placing 42nd, 63rd, 72nd, and 39th respectively out of all male contestants.

On July 21, 2021, Interpark announced that they had established a subsidiary label, Interpark Music Plus, for their idol group production business. It was also revealed that the label is preparing to launch a new male idol group within the year.

2022–present: Debut with Blue Set Chapter 1. Tracks, Blue Set Chapter 2. Choice
On December 15, 2021, Trendz announced that they would release their debut EP, Blue Set Chapter 1. Tracks, on January 5, 2022.

On May 23, 2022, Trendz announced that they released their second EP, Blue Set Chapter 2. Choice, on June 8.

Members
 Havit (하빛)
 Leon (리온)
 Yoonwoo (윤우)
 Hankook (한국)
 ra.L (라엘)
 Eunil (은일)
 Yechan (예찬)

Discography

Extended plays

Single albums

Singles

Ambassadorship 
 Global Environmental Ambassador (2023)

Awards and nominations

References

External links
  

2022 establishments in South Korea
Musical groups from Seoul
K-pop music groups
Musical groups established in 2022
South Korean dance music groups
South Korean boy bands